The following is a list of notable roller skaters and inline skaters. The list is sorted by roller skating disciplines (inline speed skating, roller inline hockey, downhill, artistic roller skating), gender and competing nationality.  Note that some definitions of roller skating include inline, while others intend to specify quad skates.

Inline speed skating and aggressive inline skaters

Male

American
 Chad Hedrick
 Derek Parra
 Joey Mantia

French
 Alexis Contin
 Pascal Briand

New Zealander
 Shane Dobbin
 Peter Michael
 Reyon Kay

India
 Dhanush Babu
 Sarvesh Amte
 Jayant Rajora

Female

American
 Brittany Bowe

Spanish
 Ghizlane Samir

Roller derby

 Ashlie Atkinson
 Bill Bogash
 Toughie Brasuhn
 Ann Calvello
 Alex Cohen
 Danielle Colby
 Shauna Cross
 Lezlie Deane
 Bonnie D.Stroir
 Jim Fitzpatrick
 Julie Glass
 Suzy Hotrod
 Hydra
 Annis Jensen
 Charlie O'Connell
 Ivanna S. Pankin
 Tim Patten
 Ronnie Robinson
 Maria Rodriguez-Gregg
 Mo Sanders
 Chloé Seyrès
 Judy Sowinski
 Bonnie Thunders
 Ralph Valladares
 Joan Weston

Artistic, Rhythm & Jam Roller skaters

Argentina 
Giselle Soler

Brazil
Bruna Wurts

Russia
Anastasia Nosova

References

Inline skating
Ice skating-related lists